This page provides the summaries of the Oceania Football Confederation First Round matches for 2014 FIFA World Cup qualification.

Format
In this round the four lowest ranked entrants played a single round-robin tournament from 22 to 26 November 2011, held in Apia, Samoa.

The winner advanced to the 2012 OFC Nations Cup, scheduled for the Solomon Islands from 1–12 June 2012, to join the other seven teams which received a bye into the second round. The Nations Cup served as the second round of qualifying for the 2014 FIFA World Cup in Brazil.

The qualification event was to be the football competition at the 2011 Pacific Games in Nouméa, New Caledonia. However, in June 2011, the format was amended, and the Pacific Games are no longer be part of the qualification process.

Participating teams
The July 2011 FIFA World ranking, as well as other "sporting considerations", was used to determine the teams that participated in the first round.

Venues
All matches were held at the National Soccer Stadium of Samoa in Apia

Matches

Goalscorers
There were 16 goals scored in 6 games, for an average of 2.67 goals per game.

2 goals

 Shalom Luani
 Campbell Best
 Luki Gosche

1 goal

 Ramin Ott
 Grover Harmon
 Albert Bell
 Shaun Easthope
 Silao Malo
 Unaloto Feao
 Kinitoni Falatau
 Timote Maamaaloa
 Lokoua Taufahema

1 own goal
 Tala Luvu (playing against the Cook Islands)

Notes

References

External links
Results and schedule (FIFA.com version)
Results and schedule (oceaniafootball.com version)

1
qual
qual
OFC Nations Cup qualification
International association football competitions hosted by Samoa